Florence Li Tim-Oi (5 May 1907 in Hong Kong – 26 February 1992 in Toronto) was the first woman to be ordained to the priesthood in the Anglican Communion, on 25 January 1944.

Biography 

In 1931, Florence Li was present at the ordination of Deaconess Lucy Vincent at St. John's Cathedral in Hong Kong when the preacher had asked for women to give their lives to work for Christian ministry. Inspired by this, Li would eventually go to Canton Union Theological College to receive her theological education before returning to Hong Kong in 1938. After working for two years in All Saints Church, in Kowloon, helping refugees in Hong Kong who fled mainland China in the midst of the Second Sino-Japanese War, Li was sent by Bishop Ronald Hall to help with refugees in Macau at the Macau Protestant Chapel. Six months into her new post, she returned to Hong Kong to be ordained as a deaconess on 22 May 1941 by Bishop Hall at St. John's Cathedral, where she received her first call.

The Japanese occupation of Hong Kong and of parts of China had made it impossible for Anglican priests to get to neutral Macau, where there was no resident Anglican priest; Li was, despite not being ordained a priest at that time, given permission by Hall to give the sacraments to  Anglicans. Hall explained to the Archbishop of Canterbury at the time, William Temple: "I have given her permission to celebrate the Lord’s Supper. If I could reach her physically I should ordain her priest rather than give her permission … I'm not an advocate for the ordination of women. I am, however, determined that no prejudices should prevent the congregations committed to my care having the sacraments of the Church."

In January 1944, Li travelled through Japanese-occupied territory to the small town of Hsinxing, as yet unoccupied by the Japanese, to meet with Hall; from there they proceeded to Shaoqing where he regularised her administration of the sacraments by ordaining her as a priest on 25 January 1944. William Temple confided to others his conflicting views but he felt compelled to take a public stand against it. It was to be 30 years before any Anglican church regularised the ordination of women; to avoid further controversy she resigned her licence (though not her priest's orders) after the end of the war.

The Communist government in China closed all churches from 1958 to 1974, during which time Li was compelled to work on a farm and then in a factory.  She was forced to undergo political re-education because she was designated as a counter-revolutionary. Li Tim-Oi went to the mountains to pray during that era because she was scared to be seen with her fellow Christian friends. She said that she nearly committed suicide during those long years of persecution. The Red Guards even forced her to cut up her own church vestments with scissors.

When Hong Kong ordained two further women priests (Joyce M. Bennett and Jane Hwang Hsien Yuen) in 1971, she was officially recognised as a priest in the diocese.

She was appointed an honorary (nonstipendiary) assistant priest in Toronto in 1983, where she spent the remainder of her life.

Tributes

In 2003, the Episcopal Church fixed 24 January as her feast day in Lesser Feasts and Fasts, based on the eve of the anniversary of her ordination. In 2007, the Anglican Communion celebrated the centennial of her birth. In 2018, she was made a permanent part of the Episcopal Church's calendar of saints.

She is also memorialized in the calendar of the Anglican Church of Canada with a feast day on February 26, the anniversary of her death.

Her archives are held in the Lusi Wong Library at Renison University College, the Anglican college at the University of Waterloo.

See also 
 Ordination of women in the Anglican Communion

References

External links 
 The Li Tim-Oi Foundation 
 Mary Frances Schjonberg, "Toward Columbus: Women's ordination marks 30-year milestone: Debate changed face of church," found at Episcopal Church official website

1907 births
1992 deaths
20th-century Christian saints
Anglican saints
Canadian Anglican priests
Christianity in Macau
Women Anglican clergy
Hong Kong Anglicans